The 1983 Major League Baseball postseason was the playoff tournament of Major League Baseball for the 1983 season. The winners of each division advance to the postseason and face each other in a League Championship Series to determine the pennant winners that face each other in the World Series. 

In the National League, the Philadelphia Phillies returned to the postseason for the sixth time in eight years, and the Los Angeles Dodgers were making their fifth postseason appearance in the last seven years. In the American League, the Baltimore Orioles returned to the postseason for the first time since 1979, and the Chicago White Sox made their first postseason appearance of the Divisional Era, marking the first time since 1959 that a Chicago MLB team made the postseason.

The playoffs began on October 4, 1983, and concluded on October 16, 1983, with the Orioles defeating the Phillies in five games in the 1983 World Series. This was the first title since 1970 for the Orioles and third overall.

Playoff seeds
The following teams qualified for the postseason:

American League
 Baltimore Orioles - 98–64, Clinched AL East
 Chicago White Sox - 99–63, Clinched AL West

National League
 Philadelphia Phillies - 90–72, Clinched NL East
 Los Angeles Dodgers - 91–71, Clinched NL West

Playoff bracket

American League Championship Series

Chicago White Sox vs. Baltimore Orioles

The Orioles defeated the White Sox in four games to reach their second World Series in the past 5 years. The White Sox stole Game 1 on the road as starting pitcher LaMarr Hoyt nearly pitched a complete game shutout. Mike Boddicker pitched a complete game shutout for the Orioles in Game 2 as they won 4-0 to even the series. In Chicago, the Orioles blew out the White Sox in Game 3 by ten runs, and then shut out the White Sox again in an extra-inning Game 4 to secure the pennant. Game 4 of the 1983 ALCS was the last postseason game ever played at Comiskey Park. 

This is the most recent pennant win by the Orioles to date, and would be the last postseason appearance by the team until 1996. The White Sox would not return to the postseason again until 1993. 

Aside from the Seattle Mariners, who have yet to win a pennant, the Orioles currently hold the longest pennant drought of any American League team as of 2022, which now stands at 40 years.

National League Championship Series

Philadelphia Phillies vs. Los Angeles Dodgers

This was the third time in seven years that these two teams faced each other in the NLCS. The Phillies finally defeated the Dodgers and advanced to the World Series for the second time in four years.

Both teams split the first two games in Los Angeles - Steve Carlton and Al Holland preserved a 1-0 shutout for the Phillies in Game 1, while the Dodgers won Game 2, 4-1, to even the series headed to Philadelphia. Charles Hudson pitched a complete game for the Phillies as they blew out the Dodgers in Game 3. The Phillies clinched the pennant in Game 4 by blowing out the Dodgers again.

This was the last time the Phillies won the NL pennant until 1993, where they defeated the Atlanta Braves in six games before falling in the World Series. The Dodgers returned to the postseason in 1985, but fell in six games to the St. Louis Cardinals in the NLCS. They would win their next pennant in 1988.

The Dodgers and Phillies would face off again in the 2008 and 2009 NLCS, with both series being won by the Phillies.

1983 World Series

Baltimore Orioles (AL) vs. Philadelphia Phillies (NL) 

This was the third Maryland-Pennsylvania World Series matchup (1971, 1979). The Orioles previously lost the last two meetings to the Pittsburgh Pirates in seven games. The Orioles defeated the Phillies in five games to win their first title since 1970, and their third overall. 

In Baltimore, the Phillies stole Game 1 on the road, while the Orioles evened the series in Game 2 off a complete game performance from Mike Boddicker. When the series shifted to Philadelphia, long-time Orioles pitching legend Jim Palmer helped preserve a 3-2 Oriole lead in Game 3 to take the series lead. Tippy Martinez fended off a late Phillies' rally as the Orioles won 5-4 to take a 3-1 series lead. The Orioles clinched the title in Game 5, 5-0, as Scott McGregor pitched a five-hit complete game shutout.

To date, this is the last World Series to feature the Orioles. The Phillies would return to the World Series in 1993, but they would fall to the Toronto Blue Jays in six games. The Orioles would not return to the postseason again until 1996.

The 1983 World Series was the last postseason series ever played at Memorial Stadium.

References

External links
 League Baseball Standings & Expanded Standings - 1983

 
Major League Baseball postseason